Scopula retracta is a moth of the family Geometridae that is endemic to Yemen.

References

Moths described in 2006
retracta
Endemic fauna of Yemen
Moths of Asia